This is a list of the offices of heads of state, heads of government, cabinet, and legislature, of sovereign states. Date of Origin refers to most recent fundamental change in form of government, for example independence, change from absolute monarchy to constitutional monarchy, revolution, new constitution.

Member and observer states of the United Nations

Other states

See also
List of current heads of state and government
List of current governments
List of national legislatures
List of national supreme courts

Notes

References